The Gulf Coast Corridor is one of ten federally designated high-speed rail corridors in the United States. The proposed corridor consists of three segments, each of which would carry trains capable of traveling at speeds of up to 110 mph:
 Houston, Texas, to New Orleans, Louisiana (362 miles)
 Mobile, Alabama, to New Orleans (139 miles)
 New Orleans to Atlanta, Georgia (521 miles)

See also 
 High-speed rail in the United States

External links 
 Gulf Coast Corridor section of the Federal Railroad Administration website

High-speed railway lines in the United States